Wheaton College may refer to:

 Wheaton College (Illinois), a private Christian, coeducational, liberal arts college in Wheaton, Illinois
 Wheaton College (Massachusetts), a private secular, coeducational, liberal arts college in Norton, Massachusetts